The Victorian Railways used a variety of air-cooled and iced wagons or refrigerated vans for the transport of all manner of goods. This page covers the history and development of the various classes, and how they changed through their lives.

T/TH vans
For the transportation of milk, meat and other products that needed to be kept cold, in 1881 the Victorian Railways developed a small fleet of boxvans with a similar design to the H type boxvans. At least 19 were built by 1886, although records are incomplete. More wagons may have been constructed, but wagons which had been scrapped or converted by 1886 were not included in that year's register.

In 1887 four vans, numbers 6, 7, 8 and 16, were fitted with long bars inside the roof, for the purpose of hanging meat while being transported. Around the same time, a note in the rollingstock registers indicates that vans 14 and 15 were fitted with "side springs", although it is not known what this meant.

With the introduction of the new, upgraded type of insulated T vans for 1894, these vans were recoded to TH.

Most vans had been fitted only with a Westinghouse train pipe, not the full brake apparatus, between 1889 and 1892. The full brake equipment was not installed until the 1909-1910 period. From 1910 to 1923 the class was progressively withdrawn, with the last, TH 11, scrapped on 20 December 1923.

TT vans
As four-wheeled wagons were not always sufficient to handle the large amount of traffic needed, a fleet of bogie box vans with thick insulation was also developed. Initially, refrigeration was achieved by having slots in the sides and ends of the wagons, allowing airflow when the train was moving. This was the design used for the thirty-one TT class vans built between 1889 and 1891. The first wagon of this class had three single-doors per side and was used exclusively for milk traffic, while wagons 2 through 31 had two sets of double doors per side. The last of these, no.31, was modified in 1891 for fish traffic.

In 1939 vans 14 and 17 were damaged in a derailment. The bodies were scrapped, but the underframes were used on R 11, an overhead maintenance van, and Q 27, a Pintsch Gas transport wagon.

In the late 1920s vans 15, 16 and 18 began use as Mail baggage vehicles with their capacity downrated to  each. From 1941 they gained high-speed bogies for express train running, and in 1956 15 and 18 were recoded to TP, then to BP only a year later (TT 16 went on to become a BB van). That is why the steel vans BP above run from 3 to 102. The two vans were scrapped in November 1960.

Between the mid-1930s and late 1950s, about half the remaining TT vans were recoded to BB, then BA classes for general goods, while the remainder went on to HH duty as breakdown or loco vans at places like Ararat, Benalla, Maryborough,  Jolimont, Newport, North Melbourne and Traralgon.

Vans 2, 3 and 12 also stand out; van 2 became a BB, then a crane crawler wagon QD, then a sleeper discharge wagon VZCA. Van 3 had a similar life, although it spent some time as a BA wagon between the BB and QD stages. Finally, van 12 became a BB, BA, then HD wagon despite that code normally being reserved for four-wheeled wagons, and finally it became VZAA, a fire attack wagon.

T Vans
Not long after the construction of the last TT van, a four-wheel van with a similar purpose was constructed. These were lettered T, and the wagons already existing and called T were relettered to TH to make way for the new class.

However, this was altered to the constant-radius design before construction began. The vans were painted in standard VR wagon red, but their roofs were in a lighter brown; this was probably to make them stand out in consists when being viewed from above.

Wagons 20-34 utilised coconut fibres in the floor; 35-40 Luplan's carbo paint, and 41-48 zinc-white paint, all likely experiments attempting to improve the wagons' retention of cooler temperatures.

Starting from October 1909, the design was changed to a  design with three axles, but otherwise construction was identical and continued up to wagon number 417 in 1924.

Between 1929 and 1934, it is believed that vans 121-191 and 369-392 were converted to the TFM class; the differences being only two ice hatches placed closer to the ends of the wagons, and modifications to allow more meat to be held inside the wagons.

In the mid-1930s, the wagon couplings were switched from hook-and-chain to autocoupler type. When these conversions took place, the six-wheeled vans lost their middle axles and TFM wagons were converted back to standard T design.

By the 1950s the T vans were starting to wear out, so a new fleet of 50 aluminium-constructed vans were added, numbered 420 through 469. They were initially noticeable in consists because they not painted above the underframes (which were in VR wagon red), although by the mid-1960s they were painted all over in wagon red. Van 422 was of a different design to the other 49 wagons in this batch, with thinner walls and internal bracing to compensate; this could have been a trial or caused by material shortages. At some point, van 421 had its doors made wider for palletisation, although it is not known whether this was from new or a later modification.

Other wagons of note are T 13 and 36 which were destroyed in a fire at the Government Cool Stores in 1937, T 6, which became wagon H1 for way and works fumigation in 1954, Ts 29, 167 and 181 which apparently swapped identities a few times, 20-34 with a coconut fibre floor, 35-40 with Luplan's Carbo Paint from new and 41-48 which were painted in Zinc White when new, T 103 which became a workmans' sleeper in 1957, Ts 140 and 143 which swapped identities in 1960, HD 217 and 222 which were converted to HD 238 and HD 239 respectively, T 304 which was converted to flat wagon K2 in 1978, HR 5 in 1980 and HZE 231 in 1985 and T 444 and 463 which had their floors modified for palletised butter traffic in February 1971.

As the Victorian Railways lost its hold on the freight market the use of the vans declined, and by the mid-1970s many had been sold or scrapped with 79 underframes converted to KMQ flat wagons for container use. The class was essentially gone by the mid-1980s, with T 329 and T 378 the last to be marked Off Register in 1990.

TP vans
In 1958 two wagons, T 297 and 283, had passenger bogies added and were renumbered to TP 1 and 2, for express running from Melbourne to Mildura on the "fruity". In 1959, a further three wagons (393, 381 and 356) were converted to TP 3 through 5. At time of conversion, TPs 1, 2 and 3 had single-width doors added at each end of both sides, but TPs 4 and 5 retained only the centre doors provided on regular T vans. In the late 1970s the vans were fitted with "FOOD TRANSPORT ONLY" signs as health regulations required. The vans were intended to become the VRPY class in the 1979 recoding, but this never happened despite being indicted as such in the 1983 Working Time Table. Vans 1, 2 and 3 were out of service by 1983, and vans 4 and 5 followed the year after.

Narrow Gauge

In 1899 the Victorian Railways built a 1 off Narrow Gauge Insulated Van, 1NTT. It entered service painted white on the Gembrook Line, in 1905 it was repainted Red like other freight wagons of the period, with the opening of the extension of the Beech Forest line to Crowes it transferred to Colac for transporting meat from Crowes.
In 1926 with VR goods rolling stock reclassification it was reclassed to 1NT.
In the 1950s it ended its VR service career on the Whitfield Line.
It is now stored at Puffing Billy awaiting a full restoration.

Liveries
When they first entered service, the iced wagon fleet was painted white with black text and underframe, and silver roofs. This helped to keep the wagons cool but it was difficult to keep them clean, so from around 1910 the livery changed to the standard wagon red (though the roof was painted in a tan scheme, to help identify iced wagon roof hatches from above). The five TP wagons fitted with passenger bogies were painted in Passenger Red.

Model railways
As this article covers such an extensive range of wagons, it follows that a large range of model railway items are available.

O Scale

HO Scale
Auscision Models released a run of T four-wheeled louvre vans in August 2011, retailing at $239.95AUD per pack of six wagons, representing all types of wagons with fifteen feet between axles. Additionally, single wagons with advertising liveries were available for a short time in September 2011.

Austrains, in 2013, released multiple-wagon packs including the T iced van, with four wagons per pack retailing at $160.00AUD.

Steam Era Models produces high-quality polyurethane kits of the T vans, which retail for around $16.00AUD. The T vans covered are 192-417 batch, and a kitbash to create the 1-191 range. A bogie version of the TP van is available, although kitbashing would be required to add the extra doors for TP 1 and 2.

N Scale

Other scales

Train simulators
The Trainz program by Auran has a range of user-created content.

References

Further reading
 Peter J. Vincent: Victorian Railways T / TH - Wooden Boxvan
 Peter J. Vincent: Victorian Railways TT - Wooden Insulated Van
 Peter J. Vincent: Victorian Railways TP / BP - Wooden Boxvan
 Peter J. Vincent: Victorian Railways T - Insulated Van
 Peter J. Vincent: Victorian Railways TFM - Insulated Van
 Peter J. Vincent: Victorian Railways TP - Bogie Insulated Van
 Peter J. Vincent: Victorian Railways NTT/NT Louvre Vans

iced vans